The black berrypecker (Melanocharis nigra) is a species of bird in the family Melanocharitidae.
It is found in New Guinea.
Its natural habitat is subtropical or tropical moist lowland forest.

References

black berrypecker
Birds of New Guinea
black berrypecker
Taxonomy articles created by Polbot